Lisbon is a city in Linn County, Iowa, United States, adjacent to the city of Mount Vernon. The population was 2,233 at the time of the 2020 census. It is part of the Cedar Rapids Metropolitan Statistical Area.

History
Lisbon was laid out in 1851. It was named after Lisbon, the capital of Portugal.

Geography
Lisbon is located at  (41.920721, -91.388188).

Demographics

2010 census
As of the census of 2010, there were 2,152 people, 824 households, and 570 families living in the city. The racial makeup of the city was 97.8% White, 0.5% African American, 0.2% Native American, 0.1% Asian, 0.1% from other races, and 1.3% from two or more races. Hispanic or Latino of any race were 1.2% of the population.

There were 824 households, of which 40.3% had children under the age of 18 living with them, 55.0% were married couples living together, 9.7% had a female householder with no husband present, 4.5% had a male householder with no wife present, and 30.8% were non-families. 25.1% of all households were made up of individuals, and 9.9% had someone living alone who was 65 years of age or older. The average household size was 2.61 and the average family size was 3.15.

The median age in the city was 36.4 years. 29.2% of residents were under the age of 18; 6.5% were between the ages of 18 and 24; 27% were from 25 to 44; 26.3% were from 45 to 64; and 11.1% were 65 years of age or older. The gender makeup of the city was 48.7% male and 51.3% female.

2000 census
As of the census of 2000, there were 1,898 people, 728 households, and 516 families living in the city. The racial makeup of the city was 97.58% White, 0.37% African American, 0.32% Native American, 0.11% Asian, 0.11% from other races, and 1.53% from two or more races. Hispanic or Latino of any race were 0.95% of the population.

There were 728 households, out of which 40.9% had children under the age of 18 living with them, 58.9% were married couples living together, 9.1% had a female householder with no husband present, and 29.1% were non-families.

Age spread: 30.1% under the age of 18, 8.1% from 18 to 24, 30.1% from 25 to 44, 21.4% from 45 to 64, and 10.2% who were 65 years of age or older. The median age was 34 years. For every 100 females, there were 100.8 males. For every 100 females age 18 and over, there were 94.4 males.

The median income for a household in the city was $45,139, and the median income for a family was $55,583. Males had a median income of $37,500 versus $24,432 for females. The per capita income for the city was $18,275. About 6.0% of families and 6.8% of the population were below the poverty line, including 8.2% of those under age 18 and 4.7% of those age 65 or over.

Education
The Lisbon Community School District operates local public schools.

Area attractions
 Sutliff Bridge
 Cornell College

Notable people
 Dwayne Andreas, CEO of Archer Daniels Midland and political donor, was raised in Lisbon
 Theodore J. Kaczynski, math professor; more notoriously, the  Unabomber. Lived seasonally at 307 E. Main Street in the mid-to-late 1960s.
 David Kaczynski, youth counselor, reform advocate and brother of Theodore Kaczynski. Lived in town in the 1960s and later worked as a teacher at Lisbon High School in the 1970s.

References

External links
 City of Lisbon, IA
 Sauerkraut Days
 Lisbon History Center
 Lisbon Community School

 
Cities in Iowa
Cities in Linn County, Iowa
Cedar Rapids, Iowa metropolitan area
1851 establishments in Iowa
Populated places established in 1851